Bipolaris is a genus of fungi belonging to the family Pleosporaceae. It was circumscribed by mycologist Robert A. Shoemaker in 1959.

Species

Bipolaris australis
Bipolaris brizae
Bipolaris buchloës
Bipolaris cactivora
Bipolaris clavata
Bipolaris coicis
Bipolaris colocasiae
Bipolaris crotonis
Bipolaris crustacea
Bipolaris cylindrica
Bipolaris euchlaenae
Bipolaris halepensis
Bipolaris heveae
Bipolaris incurvata
Bipolaris indica
Bipolaris iridis
Bipolaris leersiae
Bipolaris micropus
Bipolaris miyakei
Bipolaris multiformis
Bipolaris nicotiae
Bipolaris novae-zelandiae
Bipolaris ovariicola
Bipolaris panici-miliacei
Bipolaris papendorfii
Bipolaris sacchari
Bipolaris salkadehensis
Bipolaris sorghicola
Bipolaris spicifera
Bipolaris subpapendorfii
Bipolaris tropicalis
Bipolaris urochloae
Bipolaris zeae

References

External links
 Bipolaris spp. at DoctorFungus.org

Fungal plant pathogens and diseases
Pleosporaceae
Dothideomycetes genera